is a junction passenger railway station located in the town of Chizu, Yazu District, Tottori, Japan, jointly operated by the West Japan Railway Company (JR West) and the third sector railway operator Chizu Express.

Lines
It is also served by the Chizu Express Chizu Line and is 56.1kilometers from the terminus of that line at Kamigōri Station.

Station layout
The JR station has one side platform and one island platform connected by a footbridge. The station has a Midori no Madoguchi staffed ticket office. The Chizu Express station has one island platform, also connected to its station building by a footbridge.

Platforms

Adjacent stations

History
Chizu Station opened on 5 June 1923. The additional Chizu Express platforms entered service on 3 December 1994.

Passenger statistics
In fiscal 2017, the JR portion of the station was used by an average of 2,911 passengers daily, and the Chizu Express  portion by 118 passengers daily.

Surrounding area
Chizu Town Office
Chizu Town Tourism Association
National Health Insurance Chizu Hospital

See also
List of railway stations in Japan

References

External links 

 Chizu Station from JR-Odekake.net  Chizu Station from JR-Odekake.net] 
 Station information (Chizu Express) 

Railway stations in Japan opened in 1923
Chizu Express
Railway stations in Tottori Prefecture
Chizu, Tottori